Flavio Joseph Tosi (April 30, 1912 – December 28, 1994) was an American football end in the National Football League (NFL) for the Boston Redskins.  He played college football at Boston College.

References

1912 births
1994 deaths
American football ends
Boston College Eagles football players
Boston Redskins players
Providence Friars football coaches
Sportspeople from Beverly, Massachusetts
Players of American football from Massachusetts